Florentino Ameghino Partido is a partido in the northwest of Buenos Aires Province in Argentina.

Name 

Florentino Ameghino Partido is named after Argentinian naturalist, paleontologist, anthropologist and zoologist Florentino Ameghino.

Settlements 
 Blaquier
 Eduardo Costa
 Florentino Ameghino
 Nueva Suiza
 Porvenir

External links 
 Ameghino Partido Website

Populated places established in 1991
Partidos of Buenos Aires Province
1991 establishments in Argentina